Irvington High School may refer to the following schools in USA:

Irvington High School (Fremont, California)
Irvington High School (New Jersey), Irvington
Irvington High School (New York), Irvington